Munster is the southernmost province of Ireland, comprising the counties of Clare, Cork, Kerry, Limerick, Tipperary and Waterford.

Munster may also refer to:

Places

Australia
 Munster, Western Australia, a suburb of Perth

Canada
 Munster, Ontario, a neighbourhood in Ottawa

France
 Munster, Haut-Rhin, a town in Alsace, France
 Munster, Moselle, a village in Lorraine, France

Germany
Münster, an independent city in North Rhine-Westphalia
Munster, Lower Saxony, a town, site of military installations
 Munster Training Area (Truppenübungsplatz Munster)

Ireland
Munster (European Parliament constituency)

South Africa
 Munster, KwaZulu-Natal, a town on the south coast of KwaZulu-Natal, South Africa

United States
 Munster, Illinois
 Munster, Indiana
 Munster Township, Pennsylvania, a locality in Cambria County

People with the surname 
 Cameron Munster (born 1994), Australian rugby league player
 Jan van Munster (born 1939), Dutch artist
 Tess Munster (born 1985), American plus-sized model

Other 
 The Munsters, a U.S. television series
 Munster cheese, a French cheese
 Munster GAA, one of the four provincial councils of the Gaelic Athletic Association
 Munster Rugby, one of four provincial branches of the Irish Rugby Football Union and the professional rugby team operated by this body
 MV Munster, a series of passenger ferries in the Epirotiki Line

See also